Tarao (Tarao Naga), or Taraotrong, is an unclassified Tibeto-Burman (possibly Southern Naga) language of Burma. It is marginally (70%) intelligible with Chothe.

Locations
According to the Ethnologue, Tarao is spoken in Heikakpokpi, Leishokching, and Khuringmul Laiminei villages in the Palel area of Chandel district, Manipur, as well as in Sinakeithei village of Ukhrul district, Manipur.

Singh (2011:109) lists the Tarao villages as Tarao Khullen (Tarao Laimanai), Leishok Ching, Khuringmul, and Heikamul in Chandel District, Manipur. There are also about 8 families in Shajkeithel, Ukhrul District. The 2001 census reported a population of 870 Tarao people.

References

Southern Naga languages
Languages of Manipur
Endangered languages of India